Valley Torah High School is an Orthodox Jewish high school located in Valley Village, California.  The school has two separate divisions (in different buildings and locations): a Boys Division, and a Girls Division. The current Rosh Yeshiva is Rabbi Avraham Stulberger.

Valley Torah is hashkafically aligned with the Chofetz Chaim school of thought, which is a subset of Litvishe Haredi Judaism rooted in the Musar movement of 19th-century Lithuanian Jewry.

Athletics

Basketball
The Valley Torah Wolfpack won the 2011 Division 6AA CIF basketball championship, becoming the first Jewish school in Southern California to ever earn a CIF title, and the only orthodox Jewish school to do so.

The Wolfpack have also won three national Jewish tournaments: Memphis Cooper, Glouberman, and the Red Sarachek Tournament at Yeshiva University.  They are the only Jewish school to accomplish all three feats.

Ryan Turell attended and played as a shooting guard on the varsity basketball team at the school.  Playing for the high school, as a junior in 2016-17 he averaged 25.3 points per game, and as a senior in 2017-18 he averaged 34.3 points per game. In 2018, he received a McDonald's All-American Game nomination, and was California Interscholastic Federation (CIF) Division IV State Player of the Year and First Team Division IV.

Notable alumni
 David Draiman (born 1973), lead singer for the band Disturbed.
 Ryan Turell (born 1999), basketball player for the G-League Motor City Cruise.

References

External links 

 

Ashkenazi Jewish culture in Los Angeles
Educational institutions in the United States with year of establishment missing
High schools in Los Angeles County, California
High schools in the San Fernando Valley
Jewish day schools in California
Lithuanian-Jewish culture in the United States
Mesivtas
North Hollywood, Los Angeles
Orthodox Judaism in Los Angeles
Private high schools in California